Peter Lehel (born 13 September 1965) is a German jazz saxophonist and composer.

Life
Peter Lehel was born in Karlsruhe in the Upper Rhine Plain in (Baden-Württemberg). He began taking saxophone lessons at an early age. From 1988 to 1990 he studied Jazz and Pop music, focusing on saxophone at the State University of Music and Performing Arts Stuttgart. Until 1990 he lived in Budapest for one year, where he studied at the Franz Liszt Academy of Music and he completed his studies in Stuttgart in 1993. He is teaching jazz, theory, big band and saxophone at Music University Karlsruhe, Germany since 2004.

Work
His music includes works for jazz quartet, saxophone quartet, big band, saxophone & organ, string quartet, jazz quartet with string orchestra, chamber music and symphony orchestra with jazz soloists.

As an arranger, he has worked for Barbara Dennerlein (CD "Change of Pace"), Sabine Meyer, Trio Clarone with Paquito & d.. Rivera.

He is co-owner of independent record label finetone music and since 2004 he is Professor for jazz, harmony, improvisation and big band at the Karlsruhe's University of Music.

Ensembles
Lehel is leader of his own groups such as Peter Lehel Quartet, and he is a member of:
 Pipes & Phones with the organist and composer Peter Schindler
 SaltaCello (also with Peter Schindler)
 Hoppel Hoppel Rhythm Club (jazz for children)

Discography (Range)
 Sea Of Love (2021), The New Peter Lehel Quartet
 Mood Antigua (2020), Finefones Saxophone Quartet
 Sonority(2019), Finefones Saxophone Quartet & Jim Snidero
 Nocturne (2019), with Wolfgang Meyer
 Hidden Tracks (2018), with Kálmán Oláh, Thomas Gunther, Ull Moeck
 Aria (2018), with Peter Schindler
 Lyrical Album (2016), with Kálmán Oláh, Mini Schulz
 Missa in Jazz (2016), with Chamber Choir Baden-Württemberg & Peter Lehel Quartet
 Chamber Jazz (2015), with Wolfgang Meyer & Peter Lehel Quartet
 Moonlight & Lovesongs (2015), with actor Siegfried Rauch & Peter Lehel Quartet
 The Clarinet (2014), with Wolfgang Meyer & Peter Lehel Quartet & Bigband University of Music Karlsruhe
 Two of a kind (2012), with Wolfgang Meyer & Sabine Meyer, Trio di Clarone
 Song of Praise (2012), with Chamber Choir Baden-Württemberg & Peter Lehel Quartet
 Bone Talks (2002, with Henning Wiegräbe & Peter Lehel Quartet
 Funk-a-lot (2011, with Finefones Saxophone Quartet
 Choro e Bossa Nova (2009), with clarinetist Wolfgang Meyer
 Boleros (2007), with Wolfgang Meyer
 Soul Balance (2007)
 Recht harmonisch (2005)
 Live At Birdland 59 (2004)
 Moods (2003)
 Ballads (2001)
 Heavy Rotation (1998)

Awards
 1997 Jazzpreis (Jazz prize) Baden-Württemberg
 2000 Preis der deutschen Schallplattenkritik
 2006 Preis der deutschen Schallplattenkritik

External links

References

1965 births
Living people
German music arrangers
German jazz composers
Male jazz composers
German jazz saxophonists
Male saxophonists
German jazz pianists
Academic staff of the Hochschule für Musik Karlsruhe
State University of Music and Performing Arts Stuttgart alumni
21st-century saxophonists
German male pianists
21st-century pianists
21st-century German male musicians